Sir Gervase Elwes, 1st Baronet (bapt. 21 August 1628 – 11 April 1706) was an English Court Whig politician who sat in the House of Commons at various times between 1677 and 1706.

Elwes was the son of Sir Gervase Elwes, of Woodford, Essex and his wife Frances, the daughter of Sir Robert Lee of Billesley, Warwickshire. He was baptised on 21 August 1628, at St Mary's Bothaw, London. He succeeded his father in April 1653, and at the Restoration was created a baronet on 22 June 1660. 

In 1677, Elwes was elected Member of Parliament for Sudbury in a by-election to the Cavalier Parliament. He was elected MP for Suffolk in the first election of 1679 and for Sudbury again in the second election in 1679. He was re-elected MP for Sudbury in 1681. In 1690 he was elected MP for Suffolk again. He was elected MP for Sudbury again in 1700 and sat until 1706, and was sometime Lieutenant of the Tower of London.

Marriage
He married Amy Trigge, daughter of physician William Trigge, of Highworth, Wiltshire.

Sir Gervase Elwes died in April 1706 around the age of 77 and was buried at Stoke. (See Elwes baronets and Elwes for his descendants.)  His grandson inherited the baronetcy.

References

1628 births
1706 deaths
People from Sudbury, Suffolk
Baronets in the Baronetage of England
English MPs 1661–1679
English MPs 1679
English MPs 1680–1681
English MPs 1681
English MPs 1690–1695
English MPs 1695–1698
English MPs 1698–1700
English MPs 1701
English MPs 1701–1702
English MPs 1702–1705
English MPs 1705–1707
Date of birth missing
Place of birth missing
Place of death missing